Mahishya, also spelled Mahisya, is a Bengali Hindu traditionally agrarian caste, and formed the largest caste in undivided Bengal.  Mahishyas are considered as Forward caste.
 
Mahisyas traditionally lived in Bengal and Orissa region. In late twentieth century the Mahisyas were considered as the single most important 'middle-caste' group in south-western Bengal and the dominant caste in lower Midnapore district and southern 24 Parganas. They  predominantly live in South Bengal, especially in the districts of Purba Medinipur, Paschim Medinipur, Hooghly, South 24 Parganas, Purba Bardhaman, Paschim Bardhaman and Howrah.

Mythology
According to ancient texts like Manusmriti, the term Mahishya refers to one born to a Kshatriya father and a Vaishya mother, supposed to be engaged in the profession of astronomy or agriculture.

History
The group now known as Mahishyas were originally known as Kaibartas or Kaivartas. From eighth to thirteenth century, there are numerous examples of Kaibartas holding posts of administrators and legal officers.  During Pala regime, many Kaivartas, alternately with many Brahmins, acted as ministers in royal courts. In eleventh century, in a rebellious hostility, Divya, originally a feudal chief (Samanta), killed Mahipala II , seized Varendri and established a regime there. For a short time Varendri bowed to the supremacy of three Kaibarta kings - Divya, Rudok and Bhima. According to historian Romila Thapar, this is perhaps the first peasant rebellion in Indian history. In his rule Bhima dispossessed the brahmanical and other beneficiaries and levied taxes from them, and prioritized the interests of the peasants. During eleventh and twelfth centuries some of the Kaibartas were versed in Sanskrit and composed poetry.

At the end of 19th century scholars appeared to differ on the rank of the Mahisyas in Bengal society. Sankritist and antiquarian Rajendralal Mitra appeared to believe that Mahisyas were a caste of small farmers and could not afford forces of modernity such as school education. But Jogendranath Bhattacharya, who published a major book on castes and sects in Bengal in 1896, wrote that in the district of Midnapore they may be reckoned among the local aristocracy and in other districts their position was next only to the  Kayasthas. They were counting among them quasi-royal families in Midnapore and a large number of professionals including lawyers and university graduates. These advanced individuals, who were then known as Chashi Kaibartas, assumed the caste name Mahisya sometime during the late 1890s.

Mahisyas were, and are, probably the most diverse Bengali caste. They counted among their ranks individuals and families from all possible classes in terms of material conditions. In 24 Parganas they constituted the bulk of 'lathdar' landholders of sundarbans. In Nadia district, they formed the lower middle class and some had become rich by working as 'sarkars' to the European indigo planters. In Calcutta there was a large mahishya contingent working as traders. There were the legendary rajas of Midnapore or major landed families in Calcutta. On the other hand, Mahisyas had a substantial number of lawyers and industrialists too, and numerous modest entrepreneurs in the iron foundry sector in Howrah in the mid-20th century. Although among mahishyas there were numerous peasants with large landholdings, large number of them were small peasants and sharecroppers. Landless among them worked as agricultural labourers and daily-wage earners.

Although many are still involved in traditional work in rural areas, within a generation Mahishyas gave up agriculture in large numbers in favour of engineering and skilled labour in the urbanised areas of Howrah and Kolkata. In Howrah, the Mahishyas are the most numerous and successful businesspeople. At the turn of the 20th century, much of the land and factories were owned by Kayasthas; but by 1967, the Mahisya community owned 67 percent of the engineering businesses in the district.

Role in Independence Movement
Mahishyas played a prominent role in the nationalist movement. Deshapran Birendranath Sasmal led the Mahishyas against Union board taxes in 1919 which later merged with non-cooperation movement in Midnapore. He had been a rival of Subhas Chandra Bose for the position of the Mayor of Calcutta during the 1920s. During Civil disobedience movement(1930–34) the mahishyas paved the way for future course of actions leading to virtual breakdown of British Administration in the areas of Tamluk and Contai.

By the 1940s, Mahisyas were the backbone of the Congress-led militant nationalist movement in Midnapore and South Bengal as a whole. As a matter of fact, a majority of leaders and foot soldiers of the Quit India movement in Midnapore were Mahisyas. They had set up a parallel government Tamralipta Jatiya Sarkar in Tamluk which ran for nearly two years(1942–44). It had its own army, judiciary and finance department. Biplabi, the mouthpiece of the parallel national government in Midnapore, was later published in English. Copies of the original are still available at the Nehru Memorial Museum & Library in Delhi. At the same time, some of the most devoted Gandhians in Bengal were Mahisyas, such as late Satish Chandra Samanta.

Varna status
In 19th century Bengal, Chasi Kaibartas were identified as one of the Sat Shudras (clean Shudras), though the Jalia Kaibartas and the priests of the Kaibartas were considered as unclean. The Mahishyas have generally been considered as 'middle-ranking shudras' in the caste structure of Bengal. Like South India, the social groups of eastern India have traditionally been divided in two groups - Brahmins and Shudras. In 1901, Mahishyas claimed to be Vaishyas, which status was also claimed by their priests Gaudadya Brahmins for Mahishyas. In 1931 census, they claimed to be recorded as Kshatriyas or Mahishya Kshatriyas. Historian Jyotirmoyee Sarma has opined that the Varna status of Mahishyas is disputed.

Social condition
Although the financial, social, and political success of Mahishyas is notable, they have often been stigmatised due to their agrarian roots. Mahishyas have not been averse to manual labour (often considered demeaning by "higher castes"); for example, Birendranath Sasmal was refused the post of Chief Executive of the Calcutta Municipal Corporation by Chittaranjan Das on the grounds that his appointment would offend the Kayasthas of the city. The job ultimately went to Subhas Chandra Bose.

In 1946 a caste association of Mahishyas had pointed out that they are among the "intermediate and depressed" castes of Bengal being systematically deprived of their legitimate claims and shares in service.They urged the British government to help them by granting electorate separate from that of "caste Hindus" and scheduled castes and by granting special facilities in the matters of education,  appointment to all department etc.

As per late 1990s' reports of the Government of India and state government, the Mahishyas and the Chasi Kaivartas have practically become two distinct castes. The caste named Chasi Kaivarta demanded enrollment in the Other Backward Class(OBC) list, which was later accepted. But the Mahishyas still belong to General category and continue to form the largest caste of West Bengal.

Notable People

Spirituality
 Rani Rashmoni, founder of Dakshineswar Kali Temple

Freedom Fighters
 Birendranath Sasmal, freedom fighter, barrister and politician
 Hemchandra Kanungo, one of the first revolutionaries to go abroad, co-creator of India's first unofficial flag
 Basanta Kumar Biswas, freedom fighter, attempted assassination of Lord Hardinge
 Matangini Hazra, martyr during the Quit India Movement
 Satish Chandra Samanta, freedom fighter, established a parallel government in Tamluk during the British Raj
 Sushil Kumar Dhara,  freedom fighter, established a parallel government in Tamluk during the British Raj

Industrialists
 Alamohan Das, pioneering industrialist and founder of India Machinery Co., namesake of Dasnagar

Journalist
Sunil Janah, leftist photojournalist and documentary photographer.

Sportspersons
 Sailen Manna, Indian footballer and only Asian to be to be named among the 10 best Captains in the world by the English FA 
 Ashok Dinda, Indian cricketer

Academics
 Mani Lal Bhaumik, physicist and a bestselling author

Politicians
 Ujjal Biswas, present Minister for correctional administration in the Government of West Bengal
 Abha Maiti, former minister of state for industry of Government of India from 1977 to 1979.
 Anil Biswas, former secretary of the West Bengal State (CPI(M)) and member of the party's Polit Bureau

See also
Ramacharitam
Dibar Dighi

References

Bengali Hindu castes
Indian castes
Demographic history of India
Social groups of West Bengal